Wierden (Tweants: Wierdn) is a town and a municipality in the eastern Netherlands, in the province of Overijssel.

The municipality of Wierden also includes the following towns, villages and townships: 

The municipality has 10 primary schools and 1 secondary school. There are 2 soccer clubs, 2 tennis clubs and 1 volleyball club, this is only the top of the clubs. The village has 3 cemeteries of which, only one is currently in use.

In midsummer, the locally known, 3-day festival "WieZo" is held. Which starts on a Thursday and ends Saturdays. Every night there are 2 musical acts on the Binnenhof. On Saturday there is also the Wiezoloop. For some years the Wiezoloop has become an independent event, separate from the Wiezo, and is held the same year about 1 month earlier.

International relations

Twin towns — sister cities
Wierden is twinned with:

Since September 2010, the town council decided to stop the cooperation between the municipalities because of the high costs and too low benefit.

Gallery

Notable residents

 Johanna ter Steege (born 1961), actress 
 Loes Haverkort (born 1981), actress

Sport 
 Anton Huiskes (1928–2008), ice-skater and national team trainer, competed at the 1948 and 1952 Winter Olympics
 Hennie Stamsnijder (born 1954) former professional cyclo-cross and road racing cyclist
 Jos Lammertink (born 1958) retired road bicycle racer
 Berthil ter Avest (born 1970), soccer player, 275 caps
 Marieke van den Ham (born 1983) a water polo player, team gold medallist at the 2008 Summer Olympics
 Annefleur Kalvenhaar (1994–2014) cyclist and mountain biker
 Tom Stamsnijder (born 1985) former professional road bicycle racer

References

External links

 
Municipalities of Overijssel
Populated places in Overijssel
Twente